Road to Utopia is the thirty-first album by space rock band Hawkwind, released in 2018. It features new acoustic versions of the band's 1970s' repertoire with two new compositions.

The group's line-up had stabilised for some time with guitarist/singer Dave Brock, drummer Richard Chadwick, singer Mr Dibs and bassist Niall Hone being joined by bassist Haz Wheaton and guitarist Magnus Martin .

They had toured Britain in March through May 2017 in support of their Into the Woods album, which featured an opening set performed acoustically. The Roundhouse main show from 26 May was issued as Hawkwind At The Roundhouse as a 2CD/DVD boxed-set on 8 December, and the group made a promotional appearance playing an acoustic version of "Ascent" on  Matthew Wright's Channel 5 daily morning television programme The Wright Stuff on 1 December.

The band started work recording this acoustic set in the studio when Brock had a chance meeting with Mike Batt at the US Embassy while both were applying for a travel visa. Batt joined the project adding string and horn arrangements. Eric Clapton, who had been a teenage friend of Brock's prior to his rise in fame, contributed to the session. Road to Utopia was released on 14 September 2018.

A one-off concert at the London Palladium on 4 November billed as In Search of Utopia – Infinity and Beyond with Batt conducting Docklands Sinfonia was scheduled, but demand lead to an extended UK tour in October and November with a guest appearance from Arthur Brown and support from The Blackheart Orchestra.

Track listing

Personnel
Hawkwind
Dave Brock – vocals, guitar, keyboards, synthesiser, harmonica
Magnus Martin – vocals, guitar, keyboards, viola
Niall Hone – bass guitar 
Richard Chadwick – drums, percussion, vocals
Haz Wheaton – bass guitar 
Mr Dibs (Jonathan Darbyshire) – vocals

Additional musicians
Mike Batt – piano on "The Watcher", orchestral arrangements
Eric Clapton – guitar on "The Watcher"
Jez Huggett – saxophone on "The Age of the Micro Man"

References

Hawkwind albums
Space rock albums
2018 albums
Cherry Red Records albums